Chrysendeton azadasalis is a moth in the family Crambidae. It was described by William Schaus in 1924. It is found in Guyana.

The wingspan is about 12 mm. The forewings are white, with a subbasal brown fascia edged with black and followed by a faint fuscous line from within the cell and an antemedial fine black line. The hindwings are white, crossed by irregular black lines. There is a fuscous patch at the base.

References

Acentropinae
Moths described in 1924